The following highways are numbered 520:

Canada
 Alberta Highway 520
 Manitoba Provincial Road 520
 Newfoundland and Labrador Route 520
 Highway 520 (Ontario)
 Quebec Autoroute 520

India
 National Highway 520 (India)

Ireland
 R520 regional road

United States
  Interstate 520
  Florida State Road 520
  Georgia State Route 520
  Indiana State Road 520
  Nevada State Route 520 (former)
  County Route 520 (New Jersey)
  Ohio State Route 520
  Pennsylvania Route 520
  Puerto Rico Highway 520
  South Carolina Highway 520
Texas
  Farm to Market Road 520
  Texas State Highway Loop 520
  Virginia State Route 520 (former)
  Washington State Route 520